Oliveto is a surname. Notable people with the surname include:

Karen Oliveto (born 1958), bishop in the United Methodist Church
Nils Oliveto (born 1974), Canadian actor, director and screenwriter
Paula Oliveto (born 1973), Argentine lawyer and politician
Pedro Navarro, Count of Oliveto (c. 1460 – 1528), Spanish military engineer

See also 

 Oliveto (disambiguation)

surnames